Line 7 of the Guangzhou Metro is a rapid transit line in Guangzhou and Foshan, Guangdong Province, China. It is envisioned as tangential line that runs across southeast Guangzhou and Foshan, allowing for orbital traffic between the suburbs of Shunde, Panyu and Huangpu to avoid the crowded stations in the city center. Line 7's color is  light green.

Sections

Phase 1

Phase 1 west extension

The construction of the west extension to Shunde began in June 2016. The west extension opened on 1 May 2022.

Phase 2
The Northern extension to Yanshan will add  of line with 11 additional stations and will open in 2023.

History

Planning 
Line 7 started in 2002 as the Fangcun-Panyu-Huangpu Line which started from Xilang station on Line 1 and heads south to Panyu District. The line then roughly follows the existing first phase of Line 7 but runs slightly north, connecting to Line 2 and 3 at what today is Nanpu and Dashi Stations respectively. The line then heads east to serve and encourage development around the Xinzao and Hualong areas and cross the Pearl River to terminate at the Guangzhou Economic and Technological Development Zone, which today will be served by the under construction Line 5 Phase II extension.

Subsequently, Line 7's design was greatly revised in 2003, with the alignment east of Dashi was shifted north to Huangpu District via Shaxi, University Town and Changzhou Island. The interchange station with Line 3 was changed from Dashi to Hanxi Changlong station as constructed today. Additionally, the western terminus was changed to Guangzhou New Passenger Station, what is now Guangzhou South railway station. This shifted Line 7's plan to roughly follow what Line 7's Phase 1 and 2 are today.

During initial planning, Line 7 considered the use of 4 car L-type light metro trains for operation. However, severe congestion issues were created after the opening of Line 3, which only uses low capacity 3 car Type B trains and Line 6 which uses even lower capacity 4 car L-shaped trains, prompted heavy public criticism. Planners subsequently reevaluated the passenger flow forecasts for the entire line of Line 7, and upgraded the design to use 6 car B-type trains. Therefore, at the time of construction of Line 7, the partly completed station structures of Line 7 platforms at Guangzhou South Railway Station and Higher Education Mega Center South station were expanded to accommodate the longer trains.

Stations

Phase 1
OSI: Out-of-station interchange

Phase 2
 Under construction, opening in 2023

Rolling Stock 
Type B9 trains where equipped with 36.6-inch LCD displays at the end of each car and above each door.

References

07
Railway lines opened in 2016